Martti Elias Huhtala (born 12 November 1918 in Rovaniemi, Finland - 25 October 2005 in Rovaniemi) was a Finnish Nordic combined athletes who competed in the late 1940s. He won a silver medal at the 1948 Winter Olympics in St. Moritz in the Nordic combined Individual.

Cross-country skiing results

Olympic Games

References

External links
 
 
 

1918 births
2005 deaths
People from Rovaniemi
Finnish male cross-country skiers
Finnish male Nordic combined skiers
Cross-country skiers at the 1948 Winter Olympics
Nordic combined skiers at the 1948 Winter Olympics
Olympic cross-country skiers of Finland
Olympic Nordic combined skiers of Finland
Olympic silver medalists for Finland
Olympic medalists in Nordic combined
Medalists at the 1948 Winter Olympics
Sportspeople from Lapland (Finland)
20th-century Finnish people